William Gardner (born Billey, 1759 - unknown)  was a slave born into the family of James Madison in Montpelier, Virginia to a man likely named Tony.  He was given to the young Madison by his father as a companion when Madison was a child.

Named Billey, Gardner was with Madison from 1780 to 1783 in Philadelphia for the Continental Congress.  Madison considered selling Gardner to buy philosophy books in 1782, the same year that Gardner attempted to run away. As Gardner had previously attempted to runaway, opposed returning to Montpelier, had been actively exposed to ideas about liberty and populations of free black people, and whose servitude was legally questionable, Madison opted to sell Gardner into indentured servitude for a seven-year term.

Upon the end of his term, Gardner became a merchant's agent who worked for notable American colonial figures including Madison and Thomas Jefferson.  As a free man, Gardner married Henrietta and started a family.  His wife worked as a launderer.

Gardner's route to freedom highlighted a problem among American Revolutionary War supporters. It demonstrated a fear of slave and Native American uprisings, and mass attempts at running away, as a result of the colonies' rebellion from Great Britain, which was based on a philosophy that men who are not represented in their own governance are no better than slaves (No taxation without representation).

Early life 

Gardner was born in 1759 in Montpelier, Virginia as a slave owned by the family of James Madison, who was an 8-year-old at the time.  He was called Billey.  His father might have been a slave named Tony.  James Madison Sr. gave Gardner to Madison, and Gardner became a constant companion to Madison in his youth. When Madison went to Princeton University, Gardner was left behind and another slave, Sawney, accompanied him instead.

Legal status of Gardner's slave status 
The legislature of Pennsylvania passed a slavery abolition law, the first law of its kind in the Western Hemisphere, in 1777.  The law said that after March 1, 1780, any child born to a slave woman would be considered free after twenty-eight years of being a slave.  The law also banned the sale of slaves in Pennsylvania. People could only be sold for set terms of no longer than seven years. Two years later, in 1780, Virginia's legislature also passed a law related to slave freedom. For the first time, Virginian slave owners were allowed to emancipate their slaves.

Continental Congress 
Gardner traveled with James Madison to Philadelphia in 1780, where Madison was serving in the Continental Congress. Madison was short on cash in 1782, but wanted to acquire philosophy books, including Thomas Hobbes's Leviathan. In trying to acquire these books, he considered selling Gardner in order to pay for them. Laws in Pennsylvania would have made this impossible. That year, Gardner also attempted to runaway but was subsequently captured.

Emancipation 
Gardner was 23 years old in 1783, when Madison was preparing to depart Philadelphia as the Continental Congress was ending.  Gardner had been with Madison for three and a half years in the city, being exposed to many ideas about liberty, freedom, philosophy, and saw many free black people on a daily basis.  Gardner did not want to return to Virginia. Madison and his father were worried that Gardner could not return with Madison to Virginia as a slave because he could potentially foment rebellion.  In a letter to his father, Madison said, "I have judged it most prudent not to force Billey back to Montpelier, Virginia even if it could be done."  Madison went on to say, "I am persuaded his mind is too thoroughly tainted to be a companion for fellow slaves in Virginia." Madison considered options related to Gardner, including smuggling him out of Pennsylvania and then selling him where slavery was legal, such as the south or the Caribbean.  But in a letter to his father, Madison expressed trepidation regarding this, saying he could not "think of punishing him by transportation merely for coveting that liberty for which we have paid the price of so much blood, and have proclaimed so often to be the right, and worthy of pursuit, of every human being."  Madison's ultimate decision regarding Gardner's fate was to sell him into indentured servitude for seven years. Had Madison not done so, Gardner would likely have earned his freedom through Pennsylvania's emancipation laws.

Virginians in the city, including Martha Washington, would likely have been aware of Madison's dilemma regarding Gardner's route to emancipation.  These situations gave fear to a number of southern slave owners, who feared slave and Native American uprisings, and their mass attempts at running away as a result of the Colonies' rebellion with Great Britain, was based on a philosophy that men who are not represented in their own governance are no better than slaves.

Post-emancipation life 
Following his sale, Billey changed his name to William Gardner.  At the end of his period of indentured servitude, Gardner became a merchant's agent, shipping agent, and merchant seaman. As a merchant's agent, Gardner would handle business for several well known historical figures, including James Madison and Thomas Jefferson. When Madison needed to buy some plows, Jefferson organized the purchase by giving Gardner $34.70 to acquire them. Gardner married a woman named Henrietta and raised a family in Philadelphia.  Later, Gardner's wife would work as a clothes launder and would clean Thomas Jefferson's clothes weekly when he was in the city.  Gardner was never again able to return to Montpelier to see his family.

References 

1759 births
18th-century American slaves
Free Negroes
People from Montpellier
People from Orange County, Virginia
People from Philadelphia
Year of death unknown